Marwan Hussein (born 26 January 1992 in Baghdad, Iraq) is an Iraqi footballer as a centre forward, who plays for Al-Talaba in the Iraqi Premier League and the Iraq national team.

Club career

Al Zawraa
Marwan began his career with Baghdad giants Al Zawraa. In 2009, at the age of 18, Marwan Hussein made his Al-Zawraa debut. He helped Al-Zawraa win the Iraqi League 2010–11.

Al Shorta 
In the summer of 2014, he moved to Al-Shorta. where he finished the season as the league's top goal scorer. His performances attracted many clubs from abroad, and he moved to play in Saudi Arabia the following season.

Al Khaleej
In the summer of 2015. Marwan signed contract with the Saudi Premier League club Al-Khaleej. He played 6 times (425) minute for League and cup and scoring 2 goals and 2 assist. in October Injury then ended his contract.

Al Shorta
In Jan 2016, Marwan returned to the Iraqi Premier League as he signed a contract with his former club Al-Shorta. Al Shorta finished 7th in his first season back. The following season, Marwan was instrumental in challenging for the title, he scoring 15 goals, however the team lost in the very last round and finished third. He moved straight after the end of the long season to Iran league, without a rest.

Sepahan
On 13 July 2017, it was announced Marwan would join the Iran Pro League club Sepahan. He was presented to the media on 12 August, after the end of his season in Iraq. He played his first match for Sepahan in Isfahan derby against Zob Ahan, helped in 2–0 win, after that replaced Hossein Papi in 64th minute. Marwan scored his first goal against Persepolis in a 2–2 draw, in match knowing as Iran's El Clasico. After the absence from participation in the matches. returned Marwan against Sepidrood Rasht and scored his second goal for the club in 90th minute, replaced for Mehdi Sharifi in 81st minute. After the loss, the president resigned, and the coach was sacked, and an interim coach was appointed. However, the interim coach did not start a game for Foolad. After he was appointed as the new coach, he was excluded from participating in the next game against Persepolis, despite scoring the latest goals against Persepolis in home and against Sepidrood in the last round. Because of the administrative & technical changes, and bad results and their psychological reflection. None of the six foreign professionals were continued due to the overall situation of the team suffer that almost collapse. He playing 16 match (725) minute in the league and cup, scoring 2 goals and 1 assists. His team finished 14th in the league.

Al Talaba
In September 2018, Marwan joined Al-Talaba SC. He scored a goal and showed a clear excel in the derby Baghdad match against Al-Zawraa.

International club statistics
With clubs Al-Zawraa and Al-Shorta played (580) minute in AFC Cup scoring (5 goals).

International career
He made his senior international debut in a friendly match against North Korea national football team on 21 February 2014.

Marwan was part of the final 23 man squad that finished 4th in the 2015 AFC Asian Cup.

Marwan is one of the best attacker who have appeared in the 2014–15 season and continue to excel but did not have the opportunity to be with the national team as a striker, he predominantly played a few games as a substitute a second striker or a right winger.

Iraq U-23
Marwan played for Iraq national team under-23 (680) minute scoring (5 goals).

Iraq U-23 goals

Scores and results list Iraq's goal tally first.

Style of play
Marwan is a physically strong, and aggressive striker with good technique, tactical intelligence, and very confident in going at opponents, and ability to score impressive goals, in the air and with his both feet from anywhere on the pitch, has been described as a "modern striker".

Honours

Club
Al-Zawraa
Iraqi Premier League: 2010–11
Al-Shorta
Iraqi Super Cup: 2019

International
2015 AFC Asian Cup: Fourth Place
Youth team
2014 AFC U-22 Championship: Winner
Football at the 2014 Asian Games: Third Place

Individual
2014–15 Iraqi Premier League: Top scorer (15 goals)

References

External links

Living people
1992 births
Sportspeople from Baghdad
Iraqi footballers
Iraq international footballers
Iraqi expatriate footballers
Association football forwards
Footballers at the 2014 Asian Games
2015 AFC Asian Cup players
Khaleej FC players
Asian Games medalists in football
Al-Shorta SC players
Sepahan S.C. footballers
Saudi Professional League players
Persian Gulf Pro League players
Expatriate footballers in Saudi Arabia
Expatriate footballers in Iran
Iraqi expatriate sportspeople in Saudi Arabia
Iraqi expatriate sportspeople in Iran
Asian Games bronze medalists for Iraq
Medalists at the 2014 Asian Games